Cristian Alex da Silva Santos (born 1 December 1993), commonly known as Cristian Alex or Cristian, is a Brazilian footballer who currently plays as a forward for Thai League 3 side Sisaket United.

Club career
Having started his career with Cruzeiro, Cristian joined Thai side Phuket in 2013, following an agreement between the two clubs. After an impressive 18 goals in 40 games, he transferred to Portuguese side Marítimo in early 2015. He failed to impress during his time with the Primeira Liga side, and left the same year to return to Brazil. He played for Bragantino	for one game, before being offered a contract with Turkish side Boluspor.

He did not accept the contract offer with the TFF First League side, and instead joined another Brazilian team, Sorocaba, ahead of the 2016 Paulista A2.

After a short spell with Lithuanian side Stumbras, Cristian joined Japanese side FC Gifu in early 2017.

Career statistics

Club

Notes

References

External links

 Profile at FC Gifu

1993 births
Living people
Brazilian footballers
Brazilian expatriate footballers
Association football forwards
Cruzeiro Esporte Clube players
Cristian Alex
C.S. Marítimo players
Clube Atlético Bragantino players
Clube Atlético Sorocaba players
FC Stumbras players
FC Gifu players
Cristian Alex
Cristian Alex
Cristian Alex
Primeira Liga players
Campeonato Brasileiro Série B players
A Lyga players
J2 League players
Brazilian expatriate sportspeople in Thailand
Brazilian expatriate sportspeople in Portugal
Brazilian expatriate sportspeople in Lithuania
Brazilian expatriate sportspeople in Japan
Expatriate footballers in Thailand
Expatriate footballers in Portugal
Expatriate footballers in Lithuania
Expatriate footballers in Japan
Expatriate footballers in Cambodia
Brazilian expatriate sportspeople in Cambodia